Vinesauce is a collective of online content creators founded in 2010. The group primarily focuses on video game livestreaming and commentary videos. The group is most notable for content in which video games are corrupted to cause glitches, as well as content covering obscure video games and other media. The popularity of this content has earned media coverage from major video game outlets such as Kotaku, VG247, PC Gamer and Nintendo Life.

History 
In 2010, content creator Vincent formed Vinesauce as a streaming community and YouTube channel. Inspired by both the nascent medium of streaming and a dream he had where he streamed the SNES video game Chrono Trigger, Vincent created an account on Livestream to stream the game, eventually learning aspects of streaming over time. Adopting the alias "Vinny Vinesauce" as his online pseudonym, Vincent later founded the Vinesauce website and recruited other streamers and content creators as members of the community.

Internet content 
Vinesauce's content primarily focuses on hacks and mods of various retro games such as Super Mario 64 and its Chaos mod, The Legend of Zelda, Half-Life, Pokémon and Metal Gear Solid. Their content on retro games, in which they employ ROM corruptions and code manipulation to produce random glitches and effects, have been described as creepy and frightening from various media outlets. Vinesauce's process on game corruptions involve the use of a program called the "Vinesauce Corruptor," which arbitrarily recompiles a video game's source code in order to recontextualize the game with new effects. Several of these effects range from humorous in nature to surprising and ghastly, with some corruptions offering new challenges to older games. Maxwell McGee of GamesRadar detailed the process of Vinesauce's corruption videos, stating that "using the Vinesauce corruptor is like tuning a guitar, only instead of making something sound good you want it to sound as horrific as possible without completely falling apart." The group has also played various other video games such as Cyberpunk 2077, Fallout 4 and Super Mario Maker.

Active Worlds
In 2016, Vinesauce received mainstream attention for their livestream of the 1995 virtual world game Active Worlds. Taking place in March 2016, the stream involved Vinny venturing in the virtual world until encountering a user named "Hitomi Fujiko," a player who appeared to exhibit non-player character traits. Vinny had initially assumed Fujiko was a character intended to guide players through the virtual world, but after various interactions with Fujiko, he slowly realized the character had evinced human-like traits. Vinny and Fujiko's interaction escalated with a conversation where Fujiko knew Vinny's name despite him registering his account as Vinesauce; shortly after, Fujiko left the server. 6,000 people watched the stream unfold with many of them attempting to register accounts in order to join Vinny's session, leading to an overload of the game's servers. The stream had led Vinesauce's fan base to uncover clues about the mystery surrounding Fujiko's actions, with Alex Avard of GamesRadar asserting that "the events that followed were mythologized into one of the internet's best creepypasta stories." In 2018, author Andrew Reinhard cited the Active Worlds videos as an example of archaeogaming in the book Archaeogaming: An Introduction to Archaeology in and of Video Games.

Fake farm game
In 2021, several of Vinesauce's videos were cited in a mystery about a farming game that never existed. The mystery came into existence when a Reddit user named "Sparta123" wrote a thread on r/tipofmyjoystick describing a farming game akin to Harvest Moon that they tried to recall, with the premise involving a man who murders his wife and tries to hide the body while working as a farmer. Sparta123's post led the game rumor to spread to various social media communities, with users attempting to investigate the existence of the farming game. In a video essay, YouTuber Justin Whang revealed that the premise of the game originated from Vinesauce member Vargskelethor Joel, citing a Reddit post from user "PM_MeYourEars" and a Discord post from "AqueousSnake" that identified an animated clip from one of Joel's streams. Sparta123 later confirmed that Vinesauce Joel's video was "likely the source of the game," and Joel also apologized in a Twitch stream.

Other ventures

Philanthropy 
In 2014, Vinesauce created the Vinesauce is HOPE charity drive, a variety gaming stream where proceeds go to the Pediatric Cancer Research Foundation (PCRF); former Vinesauce member Hootey is credited with the idea for the event. In 2017 the Vinesauce is HOPE stream raised over $137,000 and in 2019 they raised over $218,000.

Red Vox 
Red Vox is a rock band formed by Vinny and drummer Mike in 2015. Their music is primarily alternative rock with influences from psychedelic rock. Vinny has stated that rock bands such as Radiohead, Nirvana, Pink Floyd and Tame Impala were inspirations for the group's music. Their album Another Light was released in 2017 and peaked at #13 on the Billboard Top Heatseekers chart.

Other work 
In 2014, Vinesauce interviewed video game developer Edmund McMillen to discuss secrets surrounding his game The Binding of Isaac. In 2020, Vinny appeared in an episode of the Boundary Break web series focused on the out-of-bounds content of Animal Crossing: New Horizons.

Impact 

Vinesauce's videos have been credited for popularizing Internet memes, such as The Daily Dot citing Vinesauce member Joel's Rollercoaster Tycoon videos as bringing various memes to a wider audience. Vinny's level creations on Super Mario Maker have also inspired similar creepypasta-based levels in the game.

TechRadar cited Vinesauce as one of the 10 best YouTube channels playing games in a 2016 listicle, noting Vinny's Active Worlds videos and the channel's focus on esoteric games and mods. In 2021, Vinesauce was cited as an example of a "comfort creator" in an article from The New York Times.

On September 30, 2022, Vinny was invited by CNN to speak about his experience with the musical-comedy game Trombone Champ. In November 2022, he was again invited by CNN to speak about his experience with the video game Placid Plastic Duck Simulator with Rick Damigella.

See also 
 TooManyGames – A convention that Vinesauce regularly attends

Notes

References

External links 

Twitch (service) streamers
Websites
YouTube channels launched in 2010
Gaming YouTubers
Video game commentators
Let's Players